Federal Route 1283, or Jalan Utama Palong, is a Federal Land Development Authority (FELDA) federal roads in Negeri Sembilan, Malaysia. It is the main road to link the FELDA settlements of Palong area to Federal Routes 10 and 11.

At most sections, the Federal Route 1283 was built under the JKR R5 road standard, allowing maximum speed limit of up to 90 km/h.

List of junctions and towns 

Malaysian Federal Roads